Kilburn is a civil parish in the Amber Valley district of Derbyshire, England.  The parish contains four listed buildings that are recorded in the National Heritage List for England.  Of these, one is listed at Grade II*, the middle of the three grades, and the others are at Grade II, the lowest grade.  The parish contains the village of Kilburn and the surrounding area.  All the listed buildings are in the village, and consist of a house, a farmhouse, farm buildings, and a war memorial.


Key

Buildings

References

Citations

Sources

 

Lists of listed buildings in Derbyshire